The 323d Air Division is an inactive United States Air Force unit.  Its last assignment was with the Western Transport Air Force at Travis Air Force Base, California, where it was inactivated on 8 May 1960.

The wing was initially active as the Boston Air Defense Wing, an air defense organization during World War II.  In 1944, when the perception of a possible air attack on the United States diminished, it was stripped of its personnel.  After a short hiatus, it became the 323d Combat Crew Training Wing and trained heavy bomber aircrews until the end of the war.

It was active again in the reserves as the 323d Troop Carrier Wing from 1947 to 1949.  During this period, it became the 323d Air Division before being inactivated in 1949 during a major reorganization of the air reserve.

Its final active period began in 1958 when Military Air Transport Service (MATS) took over Travis from Strategic Air Command (SAC).  It managed support activities at Travis for SAC and MATS.

History

World War II
The division was first organized at Logan Airport, Massachusetts in the summer of 1942 as the Boston Air Defense Wing, an air defense organization, reporting to First Air Force, and responsible for the air defense of the Boston metropolitan area.  It also trained fighter organizations and personnel.  As the possibility of an air attack on the east coast became increasingly remote, the wing's manpower was withdrawn in July 1944.

In February 1945, it was redesignated the 323d Combat Crew Training Wing and was remanned.  It served as a training organization for very heavy bomber personnel until August when its personnel was again withdrawn.  It continued as a "paper" unit until it was inactivated in 1946.

Cold War
The unit was redesignated the 323d Troop Carrier Wing and was reactivated as a reserve unit under Air Defense Command (ADC) on 1 August 1947 at Stout Field, Indiana.  It was assigned reserve troop carrier groups at Stout and Godman Air Force Base, Kentucky. In 1948 the Air Force implemented the wing base organization.  As a result, along with the other multi-base wings of Continental Air Command (ConAC), the wing was redesignated as an air division. ConAC assumed reserve management responsibility from ADC in 1948. It was inactivated in June 1949 when ConAC implemented the wing base organization and most of its personnel and equipment were transferred to the newly formed 434th Troop Carrier Wing at nearby Atterbury Air Force Base.

From July 1958 to May 1960, the division maintained military air transport and support facilities and provided base support for all tenant organizations at Travis Air Force Base, California.  It conducted peacetime operations such as airlifting cargo, troops, personnel, patients, and mail.

Lineage
 Constituted as the Boston Air Defense Wing on 6 August 1942
 Activated on 11 August 1942
 Redesignated Boston Fighter Wing on 24 July 1943
 Redesignated 323d Combat crew Training Wing on 13 February 1945
 Inactivated on 8 April 1946
 Redesignated 323d Troop Carrier Wing on 2 July 1947
 Activated in the reserve on 1 August 1947
 Redesignated 323d Air Division, Troop Carrier on 16 April 1948
 Inactivated on 27 June 1949
 Redesignated 323d Air Division on 27 June 1958
 Activated on 1 July 1958
 Discontinued on 8 May 1960

Assignments
 I Fighter Command, 11 August 1942
 Third Air Force, 13 February 1945
 III Bomber Command, 22 February 1945 – 8 April 1946
 Eleventh Air Force, 1 August 1947
 Tenth Air Force, 1 July 1948 – 27 June 1949
 Western Transport Air Force, 1 July 1958 – 8 May 1960

Components

 58th Fighter Group: c. 3 March 1943 – c. 22 October 1943
 79th Fighter Group: 11 August 1942 – 28 September 1942
 325th Fighter Group: 11 August 1942 – 13 February 1943
 348th Fighter Group: 30 September 1942 – 9 May 1943
 352d Fighter Group: 1 October 1942 – c. 28 January 1943
 356th Fighter Group: 4 July 1943 – 15 August 1943
 359th Fighter Group: 23 August 1943 – 2 October 1943
 362d Fighter Group: 22 June 1943 – 19 October 1943
 434th Troop Carrier Group: 17 October 1947 – 27 June 1949
 436th Troop Carrier Group: 17 October 1947 – 1 July 1948

Stations
 Logan Airport, Massachusetts, 11 August 1942
 MacDill Field, Florida, c. 22 February 1945 – 8 April 1946
 Stout Field, Indiana, 1 August 1947 – 27 June 1949
 Travis Air Force Base, California, 1 July 1958 – 8 May 1960

Aircraft

 Curtiss P-40 Warhawk, 1942–1943
 Republic P-47 Thunderbolt, 1942–1943
 Boeing B-29 Superfortress, 1945
 Douglas C-124 Globemaster II, 1958–1960
 Douglas C-133 Cargomaster, 1958–1960

Commanders

 Col Minthorne W. Reed, 11 August 1942
 Col Glenn O. Barcus, 25 March 1943
 Col Laurence C. Craigie, 6 April 1943
 Lt Col Bingham T. Kleine, 11 June 1943
 Col Louis M. Merrick, 22 July 1943 
 Lt Col J. Marshall Booker, 29 April – c. 31 July 1944
 none (not manned), c. 31 July 1944 – 21 February 1945
 Col Howard Moore, 22 February 1945
 Col Frank Allen, 29 May 1945 – unknown
 none (not manned), August 1945 – 8 April 1946
 Unknown, 1 August 1947 – 27 June 1949
 Brig Gen George F. McGuire, 1 July 1958
 Col Charles W. Stark, 15 February – c. 8 May 1960

See also
 List of United States Air Force air divisions
 List of B-29 Superfortress operators

References

Notes

Bibliography

 
 

Further reading
 

Air divisions of the United States Air Force